The South Sudanese passport is given to citizens of South Sudan for international travel. The Republic of South Sudan started issuing internationally recognised electronic passports in January 2012. The passports were officially launched by President Salva Kiir Mayardit on 3 January 2012 at a ceremony in the capital city of Juba. The new passport will be valid for five years.

Visa requirements 

As of 1 January 2017, South Sudanese citizens had visa-free or visa on arrival access to 37 countries and territories, ranking the South Sudanese passport 96th in terms of travel freedom (tied with Ethiopian, Kosovan and Lebanese passports) according to the Henley visa restrictions index.

2017 complications 

Following economic crises and hyperinflation, it was reported in November 2017 that the German company contracted to administer the passport programme had suspended operations after failing to receive payment of a $500,000 bill.

See also
Visa requirements for South Sudanese citizens
South Sudanese nationality law
List of passports

References

Passports by country
Government of South Sudan